Baritius nigridorsipeltatus is a moth of the family Erebidae first described by Embrik Strand in 1921. It is found in Argentina.

References

Phaegopterina
Moths described in 1921